HIP 116454 b, or K2-2 b, is an exoplanet orbiting the star HIP 116454,  from Earth toward the constellation Pisces. It was discovered by the NASA Kepler spacecraft, and is the first exoplanet discovered during Kepler K2 mission. The discovery was announced on December 18, 2014.  does not have a normal Kepler designation due to not being located in the original Kepler field.

 was discovered in a Kepler engineering data set which was collected in preparation of the first full K2 campaign.

References

External links
HIP 116454 b at SIMBAD
HIP 116454 b at Extrasolar Planets Encyclopaedia

Exoplanets discovered in 2014
Super-Earths
Exoplanets discovered by K2
Pisces (constellation)
Transiting exoplanets